The men's team tennis event was part of the tennis programme and took place between October 2 and 7, at the Geumjeong Tennis Stadium.

Schedule
All times are Korea Standard Time (UTC+09:00)

Results

Bracket

Final

Top half

Bottom half

1st round

2nd round

Quarterfinals

Semifinals

Final

Non-participating athletes

References 

2002 Asian Games Official Reports, Page 738
Draw

External links 
Official Website

Tennis at the 2002 Asian Games